Betolaza (Betolatza in Basque) is a village in Álava, Basque Country, Spain. 

Populated places in Álava